Brooklyn Park is a suburban city on the west bank of the Mississippi River, upstream from (north of) downtown Minneapolis in northern Hennepin County. It is the sixth-largest city in the U.S. state of Minnesota. The population was 86,478 at the 2020 census. The city still has undeveloped land and farms, including the historic Eidem Homestead, a 1900s working farm that is a popular tourist attraction for families and school field trips. Brooklyn Park is considered both a second- and third-tier suburb of Minneapolis, because much of the land north of 85th Avenue was developed after 2000.

WWE Hall of Fame wrestler Jesse Ventura served as mayor of Brooklyn Park from 1991 to 1995. He was elected governor of Minnesota in the 1998 election on a third-party ticket and served as governor from 1999 to 2003. 

The city is also known for the West Coon Rapids Dam, on the west side of the Mississippi River. Rasmussen University, North Hennepin Community College and a campus of Hennepin Technical College are in the city.

History
Settlers from Michigan formally organized town government in 1858 and named the area after their hometown of Brooklyn, Michigan. Formerly Brooklyn Township, the township split in 1911 when the southeast community incorporated into Brooklyn Center. Brooklyn Township incorporated as the Village of Brooklyn Park in 1954, and incorporated as a city in 1969.

Geography
The Mississippi River forms the eastern boundary of the city, separating it from Coon Rapids and Fridley in Anoka County.

Interstates 94 and 694 are located in the far southern portion of Brooklyn Park. U.S. Highway 169 is located near the western part of the city. State Highway 610 runs east–west through the northern portion of Brooklyn Park. County Road 81 also serves as one of the main routes.

Demographics

2020 census
As of the 2020 census, the city had 86,478 people and 29,514 households. Its racial makeup was 38.9% white, 30.3% African American, 0.3% Native American, 19.4% Asian, and 6.5% from two or more races. Hispanics or Latinos of any race were 5.8% of the population

2010 census
As of the census of 2010, there were 75,781 people, 26,229 households, and 18,763 families living in the city. The racial makeup of the city was 52.2% White, 24.4% African American, 0.5% Native American, 15.4% Asian, 0.1% Pacific Islander, 3.6% from other races, and 3.7% from two or more races. Hispanic or Latino of any race were 6.4% of the population.

There were 26,229 households, of which 41.0% had children under the age of 18 living with them, 50.7% were married couples living together, 15.0% had a female householder with no husband present, 5.8% had a male householder with no wife present, and 28.5% were non-families. 22.3% of all households were made up of individuals, and 5.7% had someone living alone who was 65 years of age or older. The average household size was 2.88 and the average family size was 3.40.

The median age in the city was 32.5 years. 29% of residents were under the age of 18; 9.6% were between the ages of 18 and 24; 29.1% were from 25 to 44; 24.7% were from 45 to 64; and 7.8% were 65 years of age or older. The gender makeup of the city was 48.9% male and 51.1% female.

2000 census
As of the census of 2000, there were 67,388 people, 24,432 households, and 17,346 families living in the city. The population density was 2,586.1 people per square mile (998.4 per km2). There were 24,846 housing units at an average density of 953.5 per square mile (368.1 per km2). The racial makeup of the city was 71.44% White, 14.33% African American, 0.57% Native American, 9.22% Asian, 0.07% Pacific Islander, 1.49% from other races, and 2.88% from two or more races. Hispanic or Latino of any race totaled 4,481 residents in the city. Hispanic or Latino of any race were 2.88% of the population.

There were 24,432 households, out of which 39.2% had children under the age of 18 living with them, 54.6% were married couples living together, 12.1% had a female householder with no husband present, and 29.0% were non-families. 22.0% of all households were made up of individuals, and 3.7% had someone living alone who was 65 years of age or older. The average household size was 2.75 and the average family size was 3.26.

In the city, the age distribution of the population showed 28.8% under the age of 18, 9.7% from 18 to 24, 34.9% from 25 to 44, 20.9% from 45 to 64, and 5.6% who were 65 years of age or older. The median age was 32 years. For every 100 females, there were 98.7 males. For every 100 females age 18 and over, there were 95.8 males.

The median household income/owner occupied was $88,972. The median household income/renter occupied was $42,541. The combined median income for a household in the city was $64,297. The per capita income for the city was $23,199. About 3.8% of families and 5.1% of the population were below the poverty line, including 6.3% of those under age 18 and 4.7% of those age 65 or over.

Parks and recreation
The Three Rivers Figure Skating Club operates out of the Brooklyn Park Community Activity Center.

Government
Brooklyn Park is served by a six-member city council, two members for each voting district within the city. The three districts are West, East, and Central. The mayor is Lisa Jacobson, who won a special election in August 2021.

Education
Brooklyn Park is served by three school districts: Osseo Area School District 279, Anoka-Hennepin School District 11, and Robbinsdale School District 281.

High schools serving Brooklyn Park:
 Champlin Park High School (Anoka-Hennepin District)
 Cooper Senior High School (Robbinsdale District)
 Osseo Senior High School (Osseo District)
 Park Center Senior High School (Osseo District)

Some students attend public schools in other school districts chosen by their families under Minnesota's open enrollment statute.

Maranatha Christian Academy, a private high school, and St. Vincent de Paul Parish School, a Catholic school, are also in Brooklyn Park.

Colleges include North Hennepin Community College, Hennepin Technical College and Rasmussen College.

Notable people
 Casey Borer, ice hockey player for the Eisbären Berlin of the Deutsche Eishockey Liga (DEL)
 Dave Brat, former congressman from Virginia's 7th congressional district
Quinton Hooker (born 1995), basketball player in the Israeli Basketball Premier League
 Ramon Humber, linebacker for the New Orleans Saints of the National Football League; alumnus of Champlin Park High School
 Tim Jackman, professional ice hockey player for the Anaheim Ducks of the National Hockey League; Park Center High School alumnus
 Tim Laudner, former Major League Baseball catcher for the Minnesota Twins; Park Center High School alumnus
 Dave Lindstrom, catcher Detroit Tigers Minors / Texas Tech University; Park Center High School alumnus
 Pat Neshek, relief pitcher Houston Astros; Park Center High School alumnus
 Dean Nyquist, attorney and member of the Minnesota Senate
 Kirby Puckett (1960–2006), Major League Baseball center fielder who spent his entire 12-year career playing for the Minnesota Twins; early in his career, Puckett lived in Brooklyn Park, with his wife, Tonya, who is from Brooklyn Park
 Jesse Ventura, politician, actor, author, veteran, and former professional wrestler, who served as the 38th governor of Minnesota from 1999 to 2003; served as mayor of Brooklyn Park from 1991 to 1995
 Krissy Wendell, ice hockey player, former player for the United States women's national ice hockey team, also standout softball/baseball player who played in Little League World Series; Park Center High School alumna

References

Further reading
 Hoisington, Daniel John (2001). The Brooklyns: A history of Brooklyn Center and Brooklyn Park, Minnesota. Brooklyn Center Historical Society, ISBN 978-0970843906.

External links
 City of Brooklyn Park official website

 
Cities in Minnesota
Cities in Hennepin County, Minnesota
Minnesota populated places on the Mississippi River
Populated places established in 1954
1954 establishments in Minnesota